Adrian Harpham (born Adrian Geoffrey Harpham, Los Angeles, California, United States) is an American session drummer, record producer, recording artist/songwriter and multi-instrumentalist based in New York City. He grew up in Southern California, Philadelphia and the Boston area.

Biography 
Adrian's parents are Geoffrey Galt Harpham and Beatrice De Jesus Souza Harpham. His father is from Park Ridge, Illinois. He was a college professor and much published scholar and now runs the National Humanities Center in Chapel Hill, NC. His mother is from Macau, China (she is Peruvian/ Chinese/Portuguese descent) and was a playwright. Raised by his father, he moved a lot as a child and was exposed to many notable writers, intelligencia and music and art. He heard everything from Art Tatum to the Beatles to Bob Dylan to Ricard Wagner to Duke Ellington on any given day around the house. By the age of 9, He discovered visual arts and began drawing, sketching and painting. He became very serious, attending classes at the Philadelphia College Of Art on the weekends. However, by middle school, he discovered rock radio and was bit by the music bug.

He started playing drums at age 14, being mentored by local Philadelphia drummers Andy Kravitz and Steven Wolf. He was self-taught and primarily into rock and blues. However, during the summer following 9th grade, he attended an outdoor concert by Miles Davis on Penn's Landing in Philadelphia and (the same month) a friend played him Jeff Beck's Blow by Blow album - completely turning his music concept upside down. As a result, by 10th grade, he interest expanded towards jazz, jazz/rock fusion and funk styles. Moving to Boston area for the 2nd half of high school, he began formal private studies with Russell Leach and jazz legend, Alan Dawson. Resulting in further growth stylistically and technically.

Following high school graduation, he relocated back to Philadelphia, continued studies with big band drummer, Carl Mottola and played his very earliest semi professional gigs in clubs. One year later, he began studies at Berklee College of Music, which he did for next 3 years- continuing private studies with Ed Uribe, Gil Graham and Alan Hall and beginning his professional career as a drummer in the Boston area. Notable gigs from this time included: guitarist Bruce Bartlett, Tavares, Letters to Cleo and Myanna.

Upon arrival in NYC, Adrian became a freelance session drummer, sharing the stage and studio with a wide range of artists, including: Lucy Pearl,(featuring Raphael Saadiq, Ali Shaheed Muhammad and Dawn Robinson), Leo Nocentelli (of the Meters), Icons Of Funk(featuring Nocentelli, Fred Wesley, Bernie Worrell and bassist Bill Dickens), Chromeo, Amel Larrieux/Groove Theory, Dr. John, Henry Butler, Donald Harrison, Pee Wee Ellis, Thalía, Doug Wamble, Oz Noy Charlie Hunter, Imani Coppola, Brazilian Girls, Coolio, Tom Scott, Patti Rothberg, Leona Naess, Jen Chapin, Adam Cohen, Monday Michiru, Jaye Muller (J.), Julian Coryell, Tre Hardson (from the Pharcyde), Jason Miles and DJ Logic/Global Noize, Screaming Headless Torsos, Reuben Wilson, John Tropea, Melvin Sparks, The Shirelles, The Chiffons, The Crystals, Tommy Roe, Billy J. Kramer, Gloria Gaynor, Popa Chubby and The Coasters.

In more recent years, Adrian is emerging as a record producer and recording artist. He has worked on 25 albums including two of his own, on which he plays most of the instruments, sings and writes the songs. In 2010, Adrian his first album, Music From The Mind's Eye, was released on Amel Larrieux's label, Blisslife records. His second album, On The Edge Of Change, was released independently in 2014. In 2016,  the debut record for the supergroup, Light Blue Movers was released on Ropeadope records. He is a key member along with keyboardist Deron Johnson, singer/guitarist Gabriel Gordon and Israeli bassist Jonathan Levy. He is the producer, co-writer and mixing engineer in addition to playing drums, some keys, additional guitar, percussion and backing vocals for this project. It was released in March 2016. Also, in 2016, he formed a production company Big Pulse Productions and his own imprint label, Modern Icon Recordings (within Ropeadope) in 2017. The first release on the imprint was "Day Is Calling" by the artist, Leyeux in June 2017. As of Fall 2018, he has released recordings from Stephanie Mckay, Brockett Parsons, Fima Ephron and a second Light Blue Movers album - all on the imprint, Modern Icon.

Selected discography

As solo artist 
 Music From The Minds Eye - Adrian Harpham 2010 Blisslife Records (producer/songwriter/vocalist/primary instrumentalist)
 On The Edge Of Change - Adrian Harpham 2014 (producer/songwriter/vocalist/primary instrumentalist)

As co-leader 
 Atlas - Light Blue Movers 2016 Ropeadope 
 Teleological Devolution (the Venice Sessions Pt.1) - Light Blue Movers 2018  Modern Icon Recordings/Ropeadope

Session work 
 Beauty Is Only Knee Deep - Jazz Funk Unit 1994 (featuring Corey Glover)
 Here In The Rage-Amelias Dream Funkyberger Records1995
 Live At SOBs - Reuben Wilson 1996
 Between The One and the Nine - Patti Rothberg, EMI Records 1996
 Organ Donor-Reuben Wilson Jazzateria Records 1998
 Not Around Town-Ruth Gerson 1998
 Wish- Ruth Gerson 1999
 Comatized- Leona Naess MCA 2000
 Black Cherry Acid Lab-David Fiuczynski Fuzelicious Morsels Records 2002
 Post Traumatic Pop Syndrome - Imani Coppola 2002
 Planetary Man - Ashford Gordon/Gabriel Gordon Surprise Truck Entertainment 2003
 Rock Star- Julian Coryell United Musicians 2004
 Fancy Footwork - Chromeo Turbo/Last Gang 2007
 Lovely Standards- Amel Larrieux Blisslife/ADA 2007
 Business Casual- Chromeo Vice/Atlantic 2010
 Seven Laws Of Gravity- Brenda Khan Law Of Seven 2010
 Overnite Sensation- Patti Rothberg 2010
 Beautiful Behavior-Lisa Lowell 2010 (featuring Bruce Springsteen, Soozie Tyrell, Hugh McCracken)
 Fast as Years, Slow as Days - Doug Wamble Halcyonic Records 2011
 Soul Flower- :es:Robin Mckelle and The Flytones Doxie Records 2012 (featuring Gregory Porter, Lee Fields)
 All Washed Up They Say (single)- Dr. John 2012 (featuring Henry Butler, Tony Garnier etc.)
 Wanderlust- High Duchess Tzadik 2013
 Ice Cream Everyday- Amel Larrieux Blisslife/ADA 2013
 White Women- Chromeo Atlantic 2014 (featuring Solange Knowles)
 Heart Of Memphis- Robin Mckelle and The Flytones Sony France 2014 (as drummer/co writer on 3 songs)
 Global Noize: SLY Reimagined - Jason Miles/Zoho Roots 2013 (featuring Roberta Flack)
 Where the Pavement Grows-Kimm Rogers 2014

As producer and mixer 
 Red Ruby Stars -  Debbie Deane (producer, mixing, percussion, add'l keys, strings arranging) Modern Icon Recordings/ Ropeadope 2021
 Come And Get It (Feat. Keyon Harrold)- Taku Hirano (Producer, mixer, drums) Modernest icon Recordings/ Ropeadope 2021
 See My Baby  - Greg Dayton (Producer, mixer, drums , percussion) Modern Icon Recordings/ Ropeadope 2021 
 Sailing For The Sun- Greg Dayton (Producer, mixer, drums, percussion)Modern Icon Recordings/ Ropeadope 2020
 FIVE- Ben Seawell (Producer, drums, percussion, backing vocals, add'l instruments) Modern Icon Recordings/ Ropeadope 2019
 The Jewels (drums, co-composer on all tracks. production and mixing on 4 songs) - 2019 Nievergelt
 Creole Joe Band (featuring Joe Sample, Ray Parker Jr, CJ Chenier and others)- 2018 re-mix and additional production on entire album. Original release 2012 Bad Dog/PRA records
 Songs From The Tree-Fima Ephron (add'l production/mixing on 1 track) Modern Icon Recordings/ Ropeadope 2018
 The Brockettship - 2018 Brockett Parsons Modern Icon Recordings/Ropeadope
 Song In My Heart - Stephanie Mckay 2018 Modern Icon Recordings/Ropeadope
 Red Thread - 2017 Libbie Shrader
 Atlas - Light Blue Movers 2016 (producer/cowriter/mixer)Ropeadope records
 Day Is Calling - Leyeux 2017 (producer/cowriter/instrumentalist/mixer)ModernIcon/Ropeadope
 South Wind's Jostle- Ben Seawell 2015 (producer/cowriter)(featuring Amp Fiddler, Leo Nocentelli, Falu, Henry Butler, Seamus Blake, Deron Johnson, Brian Mitchell, Clark Gayton, Doug Wamble, Becca Stevens, John Daversa, Dave Eggar)
 Queen Of Prospect Park-Little Jackie 2014 (co producer/drums/co writer)
 Unreleased 12 songs-Jack Snyder 2013 (producer/cowriter/instrumentalist/mixer)
 River Of Soul-Bobby Harden 2015 (producer, instrumentalist, additional mixing)
 Harlem Kingston Express-Monty Alexander 2012 (editor/production consultant)Motema music
 Unreleased EP-Julia Brown 2012 (producer, instrumentalist)
 Stars Up On The Ceiling - Jodi Arlyn 2012 (producer/instrumentalist/mixer)
 Unreleased EP -Christian Carroll 2010 (producer/instrumentalist/cowriter/mixer)
 Introducing Jean Paul-Jean Paul 2010 (producer/instrumentalist/cowriter/mixer)
 Goodwill-Hilary Hawke 2009 (editor in post)
 Heart Like A Jewel/You Purple Virgin 2009 (producer/cowriter)
 Red Star Sounds Volume 2 B Sides (Explicit Version) 2003 Def Jam (producer/cowriter)
 Little Red Fighting Mood - Imani Coppola 2002 (as co producer/co writer/drum programmer)

Television appearances 
 Late Night With David Letterman, The Tonight Show with Jay Leno, Later... with Jools Holland, Help, Roxy Bar, Much Music, VH1 Unplugged Live.

References

External links 
 Adrian Harpham
 Adrian Harpham | Credits
 Vahana (feat. Stephanie Mckay), by Light Blue Movers
 Radio Swiss Jazz - Music database - Musician
 Pop-Culture Pedagogy in the Music Classroom: Teaching Tools from American Idol to YouTube
 B.B. King Blues Club & Grill - BOBBY HARDEN - Jun 3, 2016
 Welcome to Tzadik
 Where's Fred?: January 2014
 Mirror
 bio
 All the WOO in the World: An All-star Benefit for P-Funk Legend Bernie Worrell
 Patti Scialfa

1968 births
Living people
American male drummers
20th-century American drummers
20th-century American male musicians